Birnara is a monotypic tussock moth genus in the family Erebidae erected by Arthur Gardiner Butler in 1879. Its only species, Birnara bicolor, was first described by Francis Walker in 1855. It is found in Sundaland in Southeast Asia.

References

Lymantriinae
Monotypic moth genera